Lion Hudson is UK's largest publisher of children's Christian books. It is based in Oxford, UK.

It had its origins as Lion Publishing (founded in 1971) and Hudson International (founded in 1977) which merged to become Lion Hudson PLC in 2003. The company became owned by the AFD Group in the Isle of Man in August 2017 upon the acquisition of the assets of "Lion Hudson PLC in administration" (now liquidated).

Lion Hudson was purchased by SPCK in 2021 and is now an imprint of SPCK.

See also 
 UK children's book publishers

References

External links

Book publishing companies of the United Kingdom
Christian mass media companies
Christian publishing companies